The Canon Palmtronic LE-80M is an early hand-held calculator. It was manufactured by Canon inc. Unlike other models which used a processing chip manufactured by Texas Instruments the LE-80M used a Hitachi HD3553 chip.    When first released in 1973, it retailed for $138.45.

References

Canon calculators